James Piotr Montague (born 28 July 1979) is a British writer.

After studying Politics at Exeter University, Montague discovered a love for writing.  His first book, When Friday Comes: Football in the War Zone (Mainstream), follows his travels across the Middle East, visiting some of the most difficult countries in that area and looking at the relationship between football and politics. The book won him the Best New Writer Award at the 2009 British Sports Book Awards, run by the National Sporting Club. A heavily revised second edition, When Friday Comes: Football, War & Revolution in the Middle East was published in May 2013.

His second book, Thirty One Nil: On The Road With Football's Outsiders, a World Cup Odyssey, was published by Bloomsbury in May 2014. The book was named Football Book of the Year at the 2015 British Sports Book of the Year Awards.

Montague's third book, The Billionaires Club: The Unstoppable Rise of Football's Super-Rich Owners (Bloomsbury), was published in August 2017. And his fourth, 1312: Among the Ultras, A Journey With the World’s Most Extreme Fans, was published in March 2020.

References

External links

 http://www.decoubertin.co.uk/when-friday-comes-football-war-and-revolution-in-the-middle-east/
 http://www.bloomsbury.com/uk/thirty-one-nil-9781408158845/
 https://www.bloomsbury.com/uk/the-billionaires-club-9781472923103/

1979 births
Living people
Alumni of the University of Exeter
English male journalists
English sportswriters
English male non-fiction writers